The  Catahoula Parish Courthouse, located at 301 Bushley Street (LA 124) in Harrisonburg, Louisiana, was built in 1930.  It was listed on the National Register of Historic Places in 1988.

It is a four-story Classical Revival building "with a strong rusticated base and a colossal piano nobile composed of engaged Ionic columns."  It is asserted in its 1988 NRHP nomination that "The Catahoula Parish Courthouse is architecturally significant on the local level as the grand landmark of the parish."

See also
National Register of Historic Places listings in Catahoula Parish, Louisiana

External links
DiscoverCatahoula.com Community Website for Catahoula Parish, LA

References

Courthouses on the National Register of Historic Places in Louisiana
Neoclassical architecture in Louisiana
Government buildings completed in 1930
Catahoula Parish, Louisiana